Anton Yuryevich Smirnov (born 7 August 1983) is a former Russian professional football player.

Club career
He played two seasons in the Russian Football National League for FC Mashuk-KMV Pyatigorsk, FC Spartak-MZhK Ryazan and FC Zvezda Irkutsk.

External links
 
 

1983 births
Living people
Russian footballers
Association football defenders
FC SKVICH Minsk players
FC Zvezda Irkutsk players
FC Sheksna Cherepovets players
FC Slavia Mozyr players
Belarusian Premier League players
Russian expatriate footballers
Expatriate footballers in Belarus
FC Mashuk-KMV Pyatigorsk players
FC Spartak-MZhK Ryazan players